The women's lightweight boxing event at the 2020 Summer Olympics took place between 27 July and 8 August 2021 at the Ryōgoku Kokugikan. 20 boxers from 20 nations competed.

Kellie Harrington from Ireland won the gold medal, after defeating Brazil's Beatriz Ferreira in the final.

Bronze medals were awarded to both semi-final losers: Sudaporn Seesondee from Thailand and Mira Potkonen from Finland.

The medals for the competition were presented by Sari Essayah, Finland; IOC Member, and the medalists' bouquets were presented by Willi Kaltschmitt Luján, Guatemala; BTF Member.

Background
This was the 3rd appearance of the women's lightweight event. The event had been held every Summer Games since the introduction of women's boxing in 2012. It had been at the 57–60 kg range each appearance.

Reigning World Champion Beatriz Ferreira of Brazil qualified for the Games. The reigning Olympic champion, Estelle Mossely of France, turned professional and did not attempt to qualify.

Qualification

A National Olympic Committee (NOC) could enter only 1 qualified boxer in the weight class. There were 20 quota places available for the women's lightweight, allocated as follows:

 2 places at the 2020 African Boxing Olympic Qualification Tournament.
 4 places at the 2020 Asia & Oceania Boxing Olympic Qualification Tournament.
 6 places at the 2020 European Boxing Olympic Qualification Tournament.
 3 places that were intended to be awarded at the 2021 Pan American Boxing Olympic Qualification Tournament, which was cancelled. These places were instead awarded through the world ranking list to the top boxers from the Americas who had been registered for the qualification tournament.
 4 places that were intended to be awarded at a World Olympic Qualifying Tournament, which was cancelled. These places were instead awarded through the world ranking list, with one place for each continental zone (Africa, Asia & Oceania, Europe, Americas).
 1 place for a Tripartite Commission invitation.

The host nation, Japan, was guaranteed a minimum of two places across the five women's boxing events; because Japan qualified boxers in the flyweight and featherweight through the Asia & Oceania tournament, no host places were used in any women's weight class.

Competition format
Like all Olympic boxing events, the competition was a straight single-elimination tournament. The competition began with a preliminary round, where the number of competitors was reduced to 16, and concluded with a final. As there were fewer than 32 boxers in the competition, a number of boxers received a bye through the preliminary round. Both semifinal losers were awarded bronze medals.

Bouts consisted of three three-minute rounds with a one-minute break between rounds. A boxer may win by knockout or by points. Scoring was on the "10-point-must" system, with 5 judges scoring each round. Judges considered "number of blows landed on the target areas, domination of the bout, technique and tactical superiority and competitiveness." Each judge determined a winner for each round, who received 10 points for the round, and assigned the round's loser a number of points between 7 and 9 based on performance. The judge's scored for each round are added to give a total score for that judge. The boxer with the higher score from a majority of the judges is the winner.

Schedule
The lightweight started with the round of 32 on 27 July. There were two rest days before the round of 16 on 30 July, three more before the quarterfinals on 3 August, one more before the semifinals on 5 August, and two more before the final on 8 August.

Results

Finals

Top half

Bottom half

References

External links
Draw 

Boxing at the 2020 Summer Olympics
Women's events at the 2020 Summer Olympics